The Informer is a 1912 American dramatic short film directed by  D. W. Griffith and featuring Mary Pickford, Henry B. Walthall, Harry Carey, Lionel Barrymore, Dorothy Gish and Lillian Gish. It was filmed in the Pike County town of Milford, Pennsylvania. Prints of the film survive at the film archive of the Library of Congress.

Cast
 Walter Miller as The Confederate Captain
 Mary Pickford as The Confederate Captain's Sweetheart
 Henry B. Walthall as The False Brother
 Kate Bruce as The Mother
 Harry Carey as The Union Corporal
 Lionel Barrymore as Union Soldier
 Elmer Booth as Union Soldier
 Clara T. Bracy as Negro Servant
 Christy Cabanne
 Edward Dillon as Confederate Soldier
 John T. Dillon as Union Soldier
 Dorothy Gish
 Lillian Gish
 Joseph Graybill as Union Soldier
 Robert Harron
 W. Chrystie Miller
 Gertrude Norman
 Alfred Paget as Condederate General
 Jack Pickford as Negro Boy
 W. C. Robinson as Union Soldier

See also
 Harry Carey filmography
 D. W. Griffith filmography
 Lillian Gish filmography
 Lionel Barrymore filmography

References

External links

1912 films
Films directed by D. W. Griffith
1912 short films
American silent short films
American black-and-white films
1912 drama films
American Civil War films
Silent American drama films
1910s American films